The 1895 College Football All-America team is composed of college football players who were selected as All-Americans for the 1895 college football season, as selected by Caspar Whitney for Harper's Weekly and the Walter Camp Football Foundation. Whitney began publishing his All-America Team in 1889, and his list, which was considered the official All-America Team, was published in Harper's Weekly from 1891 to 1896.

All-American selections for 1895

Key

 WC = Walter Camp Football Foundation
 CW = Caspar Whitney, published in Harper's Weekly magazine.
 Bold = Consensus All-American

Ends
 Norman Cabot, Harvard (WC-1; CW-1)
 Charles Gelbert, Penn (College Football Hall of Fame) (WC-1; CW-1)

Tackles
 Langdon Lea, Princeton (College Football Hall of Fame) (WC-1; CW-1)
 Fred T. Murphy, Yale (WC-1; CW-1)

Guards

 Charles Wharton, Penn (College Football Hall of Fame) (WC-1; CW-1)
 Dudley Riggs, Princeton (WC-1; CW-1)

Centers
 Alfred E. Bull, Penn (WC-1; CW-1)

Quarterback
 Clint Wyckoff, Cornell (College Football Hall of Fame) (WC-1; CW-1)

Halfbacks

 Sam Thorne, Yale (College Football Hall of Fame) (WC-1; CW-1)
 George H. Brooke, Penn (College Football Hall of Fame) (WC-1; CW-1)

Fullback
 Charley Brewer, Harvard (College Football Hall of Fame) (WC-1; CW-1)

References

All-America Team
College Football All-America Teams